Silicotungstic acid or tungstosilicic acid is a heteropoly acid with the chemical formula . It forms hydrates . In freshly prepared samples, n is approximately 29, but after prolonged desiccation, n = 6. It is a white solid although impure samples appear yellow. It is used as a catalyst in the chemical industry.

Applications
Silicotungstic acid is used to manufacture ethyl acetate by the alkylation of acetic acid by ethylene:

It has also been commercialized for the oxidation of ethylene to acetic acid:

This route is claimed as a "greener" than methanol carbonylation. The heteropoly acid is dispersed on silica gel at 20-30 wt% to maximize catalytic ability.

It has also recently been proposed as a mediator in production of hydrogen through electrolysis of water by a process that would reduce the danger of explosion while allowing efficient hydrogen production at low current densities, conducive to hydrogen production using renewable energy.

Silicotungstic acid is also used for detecting nicotine and measuring its concentration.

Synthesis and structure
The free acid is produced by combining sodium silicate and tungsten trioxide followed treatment of the mixture with hydrochloric acid. The polyoxo cluster adopts a Keggin structure, with Td point group symmetry.

Hazards 
The silicotungstic acid is an irritating and odorless substance.

References

Inorganic silicon compounds
Tungstic acids
Heteropoly acids
Coordination complexes